The 2019 WCBA Playoffs is the postseason tournament of the 2018–19 season. It began on 13 February 2019.

Bracket

First round
All times are in China standard time (UTC+8)

(1) Guangdong Vermilion Birds vs. (8) Shanxi Flame

(2) Bayi Kylin vs. (7) Shanghai Swordfish

(3) Jiangsu Phoenix vs. (6) Shandong Golden Stars

(4) Xinjiang Magic Deer vs. (5) Beijing Great Wall

Semifinals
All times are in China standard time (UTC+8)

(1) Guangdong Vermilion Birds vs. (5) Beijing Great Wall

(2) Bayi Kylin vs. (3) Jiangsu Phoenix

Finals
All times are in China standard time (UTC+8)

(1) Guangdong Vermilion Birds vs. (2) Bayi Kylin

References

External links
WCBA Official Website  (in Chinese)

2018–19 WCBA season
2018-19
2018–19 in Chinese basketball
Chn
Chn
basketball
basketball